Guo Chun (1370–1444), was an imperial Chinese painter in the early Ming Dynasty.

Guo was born in Yongjia in Zhejiang province. His original given name was Wentong (文通), but this was changed to Chun (純) by the Yongle Emperor. From then on his style name was Wentong. His pseudonym was Pu'an (樸庵). He was known for his landscape paintings.

Notes

References
 Zhongguo gu dai shu hua jian ding zu (中国古代书画鑑定组). 2000. Zhongguo hui hua quan ji (中国绘画全集). Zhongguo mei shu fen lei quan ji. Beijing: Wen wu chu ban she. Volume 10.

Ming dynasty landscape painters
1444 deaths
1370 births
People from Yongjia County
Painters from Zhejiang
Artists from Wenzhou